

Medical genetics, hematology, and oncology